Skaha Bluffs is a rock climbing area just south of Penticton, British Columbia, Canada on a hillside above Skaha Lake. The climbing takes place in three parallel canyons. Notable climbing walls include Fortress, Red Tail, Doctors wall, The Great White Wall and The Grand Canyon. The area is mostly a sport climbing area, though traditional climbing opportunities also exist. The rocks in the area are predominantly a coarse-grained gneiss and are generally under 30 metres tall. Skaha Bluffs is a climbing area with mild weather, easy access and a number of sport climbing routes. Access is from Lakeside Road to Smythe Road up along Gillies Creek.

References

Climbing areas of British Columbia
Tourist attractions in the Okanagan